The 7th constituency of Budapest is one of the single member constituencies of the National Assembly, the national legislature of Hungary. The constituency standard abbreviation: Budapest 07. OEVK.

Since 2014, it has been represented by Dezső Hiszékeny of the MSZP-Dialogue party alliance.

Geography
The 7th constituency is located in central-northern part of Pest.

The constituency borders with 11th constituency to the north, 8th constituency to the east, 8th- and 1st constituency to the south, 4th- and 10th constituency to the west.

List of districts
The constituency includes the following municipalities:

 District XIII.: Main part (except northern side) of the district.

History
The 7th constituency of Budapest was created in 2011 and contained of the pre-2011 abolished constituencies of the 19th and 20th constituency of the capital. Its borders have not changed since its creation.

Members
The constituency was first represented by Dezső Hiszékeny of MSZP (with Unity support) from 2014, and he was re-elected in 2018 and 2022 (with United for Hungary support).

Election result

2022 election

2018 election

2014 election

Notes

References

Budapest 7th